David Andrew Stieb (born July 22, 1957) is a former Major League Baseball right-handed starting pitcher for the Toronto Blue Jays. A seven-time All-Star, he also won The Sporting News Pitcher of the Year Award in 1982. Stieb won 140 games in the 1980s, the second-highest total by a pitcher in that decade, behind only his rival (and later teammate) Jack Morris. Stieb was known for flirting with no-hitters, having reached the ninth inning with no hits four times in five years before accomplishing the feat in 1990, throwing the first, and to date only, no-hitter in Blue Jays history.

Early years 

Born in Santa Ana, California, Stieb played varsity baseball at Southern Illinois University as an outfielder.  Scouted by Bobby Mattick and Al LaMacchia of the Blue Jays as an outfield prospect in a varsity game, Stieb's performance failed to impress until he was pressed into service as a relief pitcher. His pitching surprised and convinced the Blue Jays to draft him.

Major League career 

Stieb played for the Blue Jays from 1979 to 1992 and again in 1998. On September 2, 1990, he pitched the first (and, only) no-hitter in Blue Jays history, defeating the Cleveland Indians 3–0. Previously, on September 24 and 30, 1988, Stieb had no-hitters broken up with two outs and two strikes in the top of the ninth inning in two consecutive starts. He also took a no-hitter into the ninth inning in a 1985 game; this bid was broken up by back-to-back home runs and Stieb being replaced in the game before he recorded an out in the ninth. On August 4, 1989, he had a perfect game broken up with two outs in the ninth. It was the third time in two seasons that Stieb had lost a no-hitter with two out in the ninth inning. After an excellent 1990 season, a series of shoulder and back injuries early in the 1991 season ended his effective pitching years, culminating in a 4–6 season in 1992 that resulted in his release after the season ended. He was awarded a World Series ring after the Blue Jays won their first championship later that year, despite not pitching in the postseason due to injuries. In 1993, he played four games with the Chicago White Sox, before finally retiring due to lingering back problems. In 1998, after a five-year hiatus from baseball, Stieb returned to the Blue Jays and pitched in 19 games (three starts), going 1–2 with a 4.83 ERA.

In 1985, Stieb signed with the Blue Jays what was then one of the most lucrative contracts in baseball.  The contract, including options exercisable by the team, was for a term of eleven years and specified a salary that increased to $1.9 million in 1993, $2 million in 1994, and $2.1 million in 1995.  While this was seen to be generous at the time the contract was signed, by the time the later years of the contract came around this was a bargain, considering that several players were receiving several times the amount per year. The Blue Jays voluntarily renegotiated the last three years of his contract to pay him a higher amount in recognition of his years of service.

During his career, Stieb won 176 games while losing 137. Only Jack Morris won more games in the 1980s. Stieb holds career records for Toronto pitchers in wins, games started, shutouts, strikeouts, complete games and a variety of other categories. Stieb appeared in seven All-Star games, also a Blue Jays team record.

On August 29, 2010, Stieb threw the ceremonial first pitch at the Rogers Centre, celebrating the 20th anniversary of his no-hitter game, with the anniversary coming four days after the celebration. Stieb's number 37 was engraved on the pitcher's mound for the game and 10,000 bobbleheads of Stieb were handed out to fans upon entrance.

Strengths and weaknesses 
Stieb entered the league primarily as a power pitcher, relying on a high, inside fastball to strike batters out.  The brushback pitch was an integral part of his repertoire to back batters off the plate, and was especially tough on right-handed hitters in this respect. As a result, he was the leader in hit batsmen in the American League in 1981, 1983, 1984, 1986, and 1989, and he was in the top three in 1985, 1988, and 1990. But arguably his best pitch was his slider that had a late and very sharp break, especially difficult for right-handed batters to handle.

Later on in his career he developed his breaking ball repertoire, and he became very effective with a "dead fish" curveball that would break into the dirt as the batter swung.

Stieb had a high-strung personality and was known as a fierce competitor on the mound; he was regularly seen having animated conversations with himself during pitches when in difficult situations. Whereas with other pitchers this would be seen as a sign of weakness, with Stieb it was perceived as the best way to motivate himself to get out of a jam.  Early in his career, Stieb would also frequently yell at his teammates after errors, for plays that he thought they should have made. In later years, Stieb mellowed somewhat, although a fierce glare after a botched play was still not uncommon.

Personal 

He was inducted into the Canadian Baseball Hall of Fame, located in St. Marys, Ontario, with the Class of 2005.

Stieb currently resides in Reno, Nevada, where he works as a building contractor. After his career in baseball, he has taken up the electric guitar.

Stieb's older brother, Steve, was a catcher and pitcher in the Atlanta Braves minor league system from 1979 to 1981.

Books and other media
Stieb's autobiography, Tomorrow I'll Be Perfect, was co-written with Kevin Boland and released in 1986.

Stieb is the subject of the 2022 four-part miniseries Captain Ahab: The Story of Dave Stieb, by Secret Base's Jon Bois and Alex Rubenstein; in addition to discussing his career, it advocates for his induction into the National Baseball Hall of Fame based on his accomplishments.

Awards and accomplishments
 7-time MLB All-Star 
 World Series champion
 AL ERA leader (1985)
 Pitched a no-hitter on September 2, 1990
 1982 Sporting News Pitcher of the Year Award
 Toronto Blue Jays Level of Excellence
 Canadian Baseball Hall of Fame
 Ontario Sports Hall of Fame

See also

 List of Major League Baseball annual ERA leaders
 List of Major League Baseball career hit batsmen leaders
 List of Major League Baseball no-hitters

References

External links
　　
 Boxscore from Stieb's no-hitter at Retrosheet

1957 births
Living people
Baseball players from San Jose, California
American League All-Stars
Chicago White Sox players
Toronto Blue Jays players
Major League Baseball pitchers
American League ERA champions
American expatriate baseball players in Canada
Southern Illinois Salukis baseball players
Canadian Baseball Hall of Fame inductees
Dunedin Blue Jays players
Syracuse Chiefs players
Sarasota White Sox players
Nashville Sounds players
Omaha Royals players
Syracuse SkyChiefs players
San Jose City Jaguars baseball players
Peninsula Oilers players